Dragutin Vrđuka (3 April 1895 – 23 January 1948) was a Yugoslav football goalkeeper. He was the first goalkeeper of the Yugoslavia national football team. 

He played 15 games for the city squad of Zagreb, and seven games for the national team. On the club level he played for Građanski Zagreb. He died on 23 January 1948 from tuberculosis.

International career
Vrđuka made his debut for Yugoslavia in an August 1920 Olympic Games match against Czechoslovakia and earned a total of 7 caps, scoring no goals. He played at both the 1920 Summer Olympics and the 1924 Summer Olympics. His final international was in May 1924 at that latter tournament against Uruguay. Remarkably, he both lost his first and last international game 7-0.

References

External links
 

1895 births
1948 deaths
Footballers from Zagreb
Association football goalkeepers
Yugoslav footballers
Yugoslavia international footballers
Olympic footballers of Yugoslavia
Footballers at the 1920 Summer Olympics
Footballers at the 1924 Summer Olympics
HŠK Građanski Zagreb players
Yugoslav First League players
20th-century deaths from tuberculosis
Tuberculosis deaths in Croatia